Party Crasher is a 2008 album by Per Gessle.

Party Crasher may also refer to:
 Party crasher, a person who attends invite-only events without an invitation
 Partycrasher, a 2013 album by A Wilhelm Scream
 "Party Crasher" (Modern Family), an episode of Modern Family
 "Party Crasher", a song by The Featherz from their 2017 album Five-Year-Itch
 "Party Crasher", the main antagonist of The Hard Way (1991 film)